Louis Jeffrey Stabins (December 16, 1959 – March 15, 2020) was an American politician who served in the Florida House of Representatives from the 44th district from 1992 to 1998.

He died on March 15, 2020, in Spring Hill, Florida at age 60.

References

1959 births
2020 deaths
Republican Party members of the Florida House of Representatives